Globe Roundabout (or Sohar Roundabout) was an iconic roundabout in the Sultanate of Oman, located in the industrial city of Sohar. The roundabout was the centre of 2011 Omani protests.

Sohar flyover
The roundabout was however demolished in mid-2012 to make way for the upcoming Sohar flyover. The flyover was opened to the public in 2014 and thus, reduced traffic congestion which was an ongoing problem among the residents of Sohar. The project is now completed, enabling efficiency in travelling in and around Sohar.

See also
 Roundabout
 Traffic Circle

References

Roundabouts and traffic circles
Sohar
Roads in Oman